Usman T. Malik is a Pakistani speculative fiction. His short fiction has been published in magazines and books such as The Apex Book of World SF, Nightmare, Strange Horizons, Black Static, and in a number of "year's best" anthologies. He is the first Pakistani to win the Bram Stoker Award for Short Fiction (2014) and has won the British Fantasy Award (2016). He has been nominated for the World Fantasy Award (2016), nominated again for the Stoker Award (2018), has twice been a finalist for the Nebula Award, and has been nominated for multiple Locus Awards.

Biography 
Malik was born in Pakistan. His story, "The Crimson Storm", was published in Thirteen Stories #10 in 2003. The following year, "The Well That Never Ended" was published in Deep Magic #23. He had two stories published in The Crimson Pact series edited by Paul Genesse: "A Demon in the Mughal Court" in volume four (2012) and "Hearts in Reverse" in volume five (2013). "Pinned and Wriggling on the Wall" was published on the Daily Science Fiction site in June 2013.

That same year, he attended the Clarion West Writers Workshop. In 2014, Malik became the first Pakistani to win the Bram Stoker Award for Short Fiction with his story "The Vaporization Enthalpy of a Peculiar Pakistani Family." That story was also nominated for the Nebula and Locus Awards. In conjunction with Desi Writers Lounge, he led Pakistan's first speculative fiction writing workshop in Lahore in 2014, which featured Musharraf Ali Farooqi as a guest speaker.

His story, "The Pauper Prince and the Eucalyptus Jinn", won the British Fantasy Award for best novella in 2016. The story was also nominated for the Locus, Nebula, and World Fantasy Awards. The next year, "In the Ruins of Mohenjo-Daro" was nominated for a Locus Award. "The Fortune of Sparrows", published in February 2017 in Black Feathers: Dark Avian Tales edited by Ellen Datlow, was nominated for a Locus Award. Malik was nominated for a Stoker Award for "Dead Lovers on Each Blade, Hung", published in Nightmare Magazine in 2018.

His short fiction has been published in magazines and books such as The Apex Book of World SF, Nightmare Magazine, Strange Horizons, Black Static, and Tor.com. His stories have also been reprinted in a number of "year's best" anthologies including The Year's Best Dark Fantasy and Horror, The Years Best YA Speculative Fiction, The Best Science Fiction and Fantasy of the Year, and the Year’s Best Weird Fiction. His first collection, Midnight Doorways: Fables from Pakistan, was published in 2021 by Kitab.

Personal life
Malik's interests include Sufi poetry and playing the guitar. He currently works in the healthcare industry.

Bibliography

Collections
Midnight Doorways: Fables from Pakistan (2021, Kitab)
Contains the following stories: "Ishq", "The Wandering City", "Resurrection Points", "The Fortune of Sparrows", "Dead Lovers on Each Blade, Hung", "The Vaporization Enthalpy of a Peculiar Pakistani Family", and "In the Ruins of Mohenjo-Daro".

Short works
"The Crimson Storm" in Thirteen Stories #10, edited by Jennifer M. Brooks (June 2003, Nocturna Digital Press)
"The Well That Never Ended" in Deep Magic #23, edited by Jeremy Whitted (April 2004, Amberlin)
"A Demon in the Mughal Court" in The Crimson Pact, Volume 4, edited by Paul Genesse (September 2012, Alliteration Ink)
"Pinned and Wriggling on the Wall" in Daily Science Fiction, edited by Michele Barasso and Jonathan Laden (June 2013)
"Hearts in Reverse" in The Crimson Pact, Volume 5, edited by Paul Genesse (2013, Iron Dragon Books)
"Blood Women" in Chiral Mad 2, edited by Michael Bailey (December 2013, Written Backwards)
"Resurrection Points" in Strange Horizons, edited by Niall Harrison (August 2014)
"The Vaporization Enthalpy of a Peculiar Pakistani Family" in Qualia Nous, edited by Michael Bailey (2014, Written Backwards)
"Laal Andhi" in Truth or Dare?, edited by Max Booth III (2014, Perpetual Motion Machine Publishing)
"Ishq" in Black Static #43, edited by Andy Cox (November/December 2014, TTA Press)
"The Pauper Prince and the Eucalyptus Jinn" in Tor.com, edited by Ellen Datlow (April 2015)
"The Last Manuscript" in Gamut, edited by Richard Thomas (November 2017, Gamut Magazine)
"In the Ruins of Mohenjo-Daro" in The Mammoth Book of Cthulhu: New Lovecraftian Fiction, edited by Paula Guran (April 2016, Robinson)
"The Fortune of Sparrows" in Black Feathers: Dark Avian Tales, edited by Ellen Datlow (February 2017, Pegasus Books)
"Emperors of Jinn" in The Djinn Falls in Love & Other Stories, edited by Mahvesh Murad and Jared Shurin (March 2017, Solaris Books)
"Dead Lovers on Each Blade, Hung" in Nightmare Magazine, edited by John Joseph Adams (November 2018, Nightmare Magazine)
"Folie à Deux, or the Ticking Hourglass" in Final Cuts: New Tales of Hollywood Horror and Other Spectacles, edited by Ellen Datlow (June 2020, Anchor Books)
"The Wandering City" in Us in Flux, part of the Center for Science and the Imagination at Arizona State University (July 2020)

Poetry
"Blood Blues" in Space and Time #122, edited by Hildy Silverman (Fall/Winter 2014)

Awards and recognition

References

Living people
Pakistani male short story writers
Pakistani short story writers
Pakistani horror writers
Year of birth missing (living people)